van 't Hek is a Dutch surname. Notable people with the surname include:

Tom van 't Hek (born 1958), Dutch field hockey player
Youp van 't Hek (born 1954), Dutch comedian
 

Dutch-language surnames
Surnames of Dutch origin